Leonard Albert Kravitz (born May 26, 1964) is an American singer-songwriter and actor. His style incorporates elements of rock, blues, soul, R&B, funk, jazz, reggae, hard rock, psychedelic, pop and folk.

Kravitz won the Grammy Award for Best Male Rock Vocal Performance four years in a row from 1999 to 2002, breaking the record for most wins in that category and setting the record for most consecutive wins in one category by a male. He has been nominated for and won other awards, including American Music Awards, MTV Video Music Awards, Radio Music Awards, Brit Awards, and Blockbuster Entertainment Awards. Kravitz's hit singles include "It Ain't Over 'til It's Over" (1991) and "Again" (2000), each of which reached the top 10 on the Billboard Top 100 chart; other hits include "Let Love Rule" (1989), "Always on the Run" (1991), "Are You Gonna Go My Way" (1993), "Fly Away" (1998), and "American Woman" (1999), each of which reached the top 10 on the Alternative Airplay chart.

Kravitz was ranked at No. 93 on VH1's "100 Greatest Artists of Hard Rock". He was made an Officer of the Ordre des Arts et des Lettres in 2011, and has played Cinna in the Hunger Games film series. In his career, Kravitz has sold over 40 million albums worldwide. He is the son of actress Roxie Roker, a cousin of television anchor Al Roker, and the father of actress Zoë Kravitz.

Early life
Leonard Albert Kravitz was born in New York City, the only child of NBC television news producer Sy Kravitz (1924–2005) and actress Roxie Roker (1929–1995). His mother came from a Christian family which was of African-American and Bahamian descent. Kravitz's father was of Russian-Jewish ancestry. Through his mother, Kravitz is a second cousin of television weather presenter Al Roker as their grandfathers were brothers. He was named after his uncle, Leonard M. Kravitz, a private first class who was killed in action in the Korean War at the age of 20, while single-handedly holding off a Chinese attack, enabling most of his platoon to escape.

During his early years, Kravitz did not grow up in a religious environment. After a spiritual experience when he was 13, he started attending church and later became a non-denominational Christian. Kravitz grew up spending weekdays on the Upper East Side of Manhattan with his parents, attending P.S. 6 for elementary school, and spending weekends at his grandmother Bessie's house in the Bedford-Stuyvesant neighborhood of Brooklyn.

Kravitz began banging on pots and pans in the kitchen, playing them as drums at the age of three. He decided that he wanted to be a musician at the age of five. He began playing the drums and soon added guitar. He grew up listening to the music his parents listened to: R&B, jazz, classical, opera, gospel, and blues. He said, "My parents were very supportive of the fact that I loved music early on, and they took me to a lot of shows." Around the age of seven, he saw the Jackson 5 perform at Madison Square Garden, and they became his favorite performers. His father, who was also a jazz promoter, was friends with Duke Ellington, Sarah Vaughan, Count Basie, Ella Fitzgerald, Bobby Short, Miles Davis, and other jazz greats; Ellington even played "Happy Birthday" for him on his fifth birthday.

In 1974, at the age of 10, Kravitz relocated to Los Angeles with his parents when his mother landed her role on The Jeffersons. At his mother's urging, he joined the California Boys Choir for three years, where he performed a classical repertoire, and sang with the Metropolitan Opera. He took part in Mahler's Third Symphony at the Hollywood Bowl. It was in Los Angeles that Kravitz was introduced to rock music, listening to the Beatles, the Rolling Stones, Led Zeppelin, Jimi Hendrix, the Grateful Dead, Aerosmith, Black Sabbath, Creedence Clearwater Revival, Kiss, Pink Floyd, and the Who, and he said he was "attracted to the cool style, the girls, the rock 'n' roll lifestyle." During his junior high school years, he was also introduced to marijuana; he has stated that he was a "pothead" during his youth. His other musical influences at the time included Fela Kuti, Bill Withers, Marvin Gaye, Pharoah Sanders, and Miles Davis. Later influences came in the form of John Lennon and Bob Marley. Kravitz attended Beverly Hills High School, where he was classmates with Maria McKee, Nicolas Cage, and Slash. He taught himself to play piano and bass and made friends with Zoro, who would later become his long-time collaborator. His parents divorced in 1985, which had a profound impact on him.

Kravitz is the honorary nephew of Diahann Carroll, whom he called Aunt D, and actress Cicely Tyson was his godmother.

Career

1985–1990: Virgin Records and career debut
With record labels still telling him his music was not "black enough" or "white enough," Kravitz decided to record an album on his own under the name Romeo Blue. Kravitz had met the recording engineer, keyboardist, and bassist Henry Hirsch in 1985 when recording a demo at his Hoboken, New Jersey recording studio. The two shared an interest in using real instruments and vintage recording equipment, as well as a love of R&B, jazz, and rock. Kravitz would go on to collaborate with Hirsch on most of his albums. Kravitz began working on his debut album with Hirsch over the next year and a half, with Kravitz's father paying for the studio time. Kravitz met saxophonist Karl Denson and invited him to play on the song "Let Love Rule." Kravitz was so impressed with his playing that Denson played on much of the album. Beginning in the late 1980s, Denson toured with Kravitz for five years.

In October 1988, after completing most of the recording, Kravitz approached friend Stephen Elvis Smith, who had served as the music supervisor on Lisa Bonet's The Cosby Show spin-off A Different World. Smith had also worked with Kravitz's mother on the hit sitcom The Jeffersons. Kravitz urged Smith to manage his career and assist him in finding a record deal. In less than a month of shopping the recordings, five labels (Warner Bros, Elektra, Geffen, Capitol, and Virgin) were in a bidding war for Kravitz. Eventually, a deal was made with Virgin Records in January 1989, and signed by Virgin A&R executive Nancy Jeffries. The label was "excited" about the music he was making, music inspired by his relationship with wife Bonet and their new daughter, Zoe. On Smith's urging, Kravitz dropped the name Romeo Blue and reclaimed the Lenny Kravitz moniker. About his time as Romeo Blue, Kravitz said, "Ultimately, it got me back to myself. And when I finally did accept myself for myself, music started flowing out of me."

Kravitz released his debut album Let Love Rule in 1989, a combination of rock and funk with a 1960s vibe. Music critics were mixed: some felt Kravitz was a gifted new artist, others felt he was overpowered by his musical influences. The album was a moderate success in the United States, but became an instant hit outside of the US, especially in Europe. Lisa Bonet directed the debut music video for the title track, "Let Love Rule." Stephen Smith signed Kravitz with talent booking agency CAA, who soon were fielding offers for Kravitz, first on a club tour, and then in opening slots for Tom Petty & the Heartbreakers, Bob Dylan, and David Bowie. Having played essentially all of the instruments on the album, Kravitz had to quickly assemble a touring band to support the Let Love Rule release. In May 2009, a 20th anniversary deluxe edition of Let Love Rule was released worldwide by Virgin. Kravitz launched a LLR(20) tour of Europe and the United States in support of the re-release.

1991–2001: Popularity established

In May 1990, he performed the song "Cold Turkey" at the John Lennon Memorial concert. In 1990, Kravitz produced the song "Justify My Love" for Madonna, which he co-wrote with Ingrid Chavez. The song, which appeared on her greatest hits album The Immaculate Collection and created controversy because of its explicit video, went to number 1 for two consecutive weeks. Kravitz appeared as a member of Peace Choir that performed "Give Peace a Chance" in 1991 in protest of the Gulf War.

Kravitz separated from Lisa Bonet in 1991, amid rumors of an affair between him and Madonna. Kravitz has denied any infidelity. Kravitz and Bonet divorced in 1993. Kravitz produced the self-titled album Vanessa Paradis (1991) for French singer and actress Vanessa Paradis. He played most of the instruments and co-wrote most of the songs on the album.

In 1991, Kravitz released his second album, Mama Said, which was his first album to reach the Top 40. The songs on the album were about Bonet and dedicated to her, documenting his depression over their breakup. The single, "It Ain't Over 'til It's Over," went to number 2 on the Billboard Hot 100. A second single "Always on the Run," a tribute to his mother, featured Slash on guitar. "Stand by My Woman" and "What Goes Around Comes Around" followed. Sean Lennon co-wrote and played piano on the song "All I Ever Wanted."

In 1993, Kravitz wrote "Line Up" for Aerosmith, and appeared on Mick Jagger's solo album, Wandering Spirit, on a cover of the Bill Withers soul classic "Use Me," and played guitar on the title track of David Bowie's The Buddha of Suburbia. That year Kravitz also worked with idols Al Green and Curtis Mayfield. In 1993, Are You Gonna Go My Way was released, reaching number 12 on the Billboard 200 and Kravitz earned a BRIT Award for best international male artist in 1994. The title track won a MTV Video Music Award for Best Male Video for the video produced by Mark Romanek, in which Kravitz slung his dreadlocks and wore high-heeled platform boots. During the presentation of the MTV Video Music Awards, he performed the song with John Paul Jones of Led Zeppelin on bass. Several singles from the album would follow, including "Believe," "Is There Any Love In Your Heart," and "Heaven Help/Spinning Around Over You." This album was the first to feature guitarist Craig Ross, who has also played on all his subsequent albums. One song, "Eleutheria," was influenced by the island Eleuthera in The Bahamas where Kravitz built a house and recording studio. In 1993, he also released the EP Spinning Around Over You, which included four live tracks from his Universal Love Tour. A feature documentary about his 1994 tour entitled Alive from Planet Earth was directed by Doug Nichol and released.

In 1994, Kravitz recorded "Main Squeeze" with Teena Marie from her Passion Play CD. Kravitz also made a video to pay tribute to Teena Marie when she suddenly died on December 26, 2010. He recorded a funk-rock version of the song "Deuce" for the KISS cover album Kiss My Ass: Classic Kiss Regrooved. The track featured Stevie Wonder on harmonica and background vocals. This song was one of three radio singles from the album, and was also the album's lead-off track. Roxie Roker, Kravitz's mother, died in California on December 2, 1995, of breast cancer at the age of 66. In 1995, Kravitz released the album Circus, which went to number 10 on the Billboard chart on the back of his past achievement. However, the album only had two hit singles: "Rock and Roll Is Dead" and "Can't Get You Off My Mind."

With 5 (1998), Kravitz embraced digital technology such as Pro Tools and samplers for the first time. Recorded in both his own New York City carriage house, and Compass Point Studios in The Bahamas, Kravitz employed engineer/producer Terry Manning to handle the recording duties. 5 introduced his music to an even wider audience thanks to the hit single "Fly Away" being featured prominently in both car manufacturer and airline commercials. 5 would reach number 28 on the Billboard 200, with "Fly Away" peaking at number twelve on the Billboard Hot 100, topping both the Billboard Mainstream Rock Tracks and Modern Rock Tracks charts, and also topping the charts in Iceland and the United Kingdom. He would win the first of his four consecutive Grammy for Best Male Rock Vocal Performance at the Grammy Awards of 1999. Other hits from the album included "If You Can't Say No", that was remixed by dance producer Brian Transeau, and "I Belong to You." For the "I Belong to You" video Kravitz can be seen without his signature dreadlocks. In 1999 he produced and sang with Cree Summer on her solo album Street Faërie.

His cover version of the Guess Who's hit "American Woman" won him another Grammy at the Grammy Awards of 2000 and helped the Guess Who's song reach a new audience. Kravitz's version of the song originally came from the soundtrack of Austin Powers: The Spy Who Shagged Me and was added to 5 as a bonus track in 1999. Kravitz worked on two songs for Michael Jackson's Invincible album released in 2001; a snippet of "Another Day" was leaked, and the full version was officially released on the album Michael in 2010.

Kravitz released a Greatest Hits album in 2000. It proved to be his most successful album, reaching #2 on the Billboard 200 and selling nearly 11 million copies worldwide and ultimately becoming one of the most commercially successful albums of the decade. The single "Again" earned him his third consecutive Grammy for the Best Male Rock Vocal in the Grammy Awards of 2001 and peaked at number 4 on the US Billboard Hot 100. Kravitz also co-wrote the song "God Gave Me Everything" with Mick Jagger in this period, appearing on Jagger's 2001 solo album Goddess in the Doorway and in the film Being Mick. In 2001, Kravitz participated in a benefit auction for the Red Hot Organization, in conjunction with Amazon.com to increase public AIDS awareness, which ran from February 28 until April 11, 2001. The event featured rare RHO memorabilia and the work of Rolling Stone photographer Mark Seliger.

2001–2005: Lenny and Baptism

Kravitz released his sixth album Lenny in October 2001. The album was recorded in Miami. Kravitz wrote the song "Bank Robber Man" after the Miami Police Department detained and cuffed him while walking to the gym with his trainer because police stated that he matched the description of a bank robber. Kravitz did not have any identification with him at the time and the police on the scene did not believe that he was indeed Lenny Kravitz. The bank teller who was robbed was then brought to the scene and said Kravitz was not the bank robber. Miami Police later sent officers to Kravitz's home to apologize for the detention. When asked if he thought the incident was a case of racial profiling, Kravitz said he was not sure although some of the lyrics in the song suggest otherwise. The first single from the album, "Dig In," went to number 1 in Argentina and the top 10 in Italy and Portugal. The video for "Dig In" was originally supposed to be shot at the top of the Empire State Building on September 12, 2001 but the terrorist attacks on the World Trade Center on September 11, 2001 caused the location to be moved. The video was later shot off the coast of Miami. He won his fourth Grammy in 2002. "Stillness of Heart," "Believe in Me," and "If I Could Fall In Love" were subsequent singles from the album.

Kravitz was the subject of a photo book by former chief photographer for Rolling Stone, Mark Seliger. Published in November 2001, Seliger captures Kravitz on tour, with family, with friends, and in posed portraits. Jay-Z invited Kravitz to appear on the track "Guns and Roses" on his 2002 The Blueprint²: The Gift & the Curse. Kravitz would also join P. Diddy, Pharrell, and Loon on the track "Show Me Your Soul" from the Bad Boys II Soundtrack. In September 2002, Kravitz appeared alongside other rock stars in the episode "How I Spent My Strummer Vacation" of The Simpsons. In early 2003, Kravitz released the track "We Want Peace" as a download-only track as a protest against the 2003 invasion of Iraq, he performed this alongside famous Iraqi singer Kazem Al Saher at Rock the Vote. The track reached #1 on the world internet download charts and MP3.com download chart. Kravitz also appeared on Unity, the official album of the 2004 Athens Olympics, and performed a cover of "Have You Ever Been (To Electric Ladyland)" on the album Power of Soul: A Tribute to Jimi Hendrix.

Kravitz's seventh album Baptism was released in May 2004. The first single was "Where Are We Runnin'?" The single "California" failed to be commercially successful, but "Storm", featuring Jay-Z, reached the charts. "Calling All Angels" was successful in various countries and a huge hit in Brazil, however it was "Lady" that became the album's surprise hit, making the US Top 30 and propelling Baptism to gold status. Also in 2004, he appeared on N.E.R.D's album Fly or Die. From March 2005, Kravitz toured all over the world with the tour Electric Church, which ended at the Brixton Academy, London in July 2005. Kravitz served as the opening act for Aerosmith who are long-term friends of Kravitz on their fall 2005 tour. The tour began on October 30 at the Mohegan Sun Arena in Uncasville, Connecticut. The night before that tour started, October 29, 2005, Kravitz's father, TV producer Seymour "Sy" Kravitz, died. During that first show, Kravitz broke the news to the stunned crowd and stated it was not a time to be sad, but rather a time to celebrate because he is now in Heaven. Kravitz then dedicated Let Love Rule to his father. That tour was so successful that it was extended through February 25, 2006 and ended in Anaheim, California.

2006–2009: Live Earth, charity work, and It Is Time for a Love Revolution

In January 2006, Kravitz contributed "Breathe" to absoluttracks, a project sponsored by Absolut Vodka. This song was re-mixed by ten musical producers and distributed via the internet. Kravitz appeared in the audience of Madonna's Confessions Tour (2006) during numerous shows. He later joined Madonna live on stage to play guitar on the song, "I Love New York," at the last of four Paris shows. Kravitz founded a design firm named Kravitz Design, stating if he hadn't been a musician he would have been a designer. Kravitz Design, focused on interior and furniture design, has designed residential spaces, as well as a chandelier for the crystal company Swarovski, named "Casino Royale."

On July 7, 2007, Kravitz performed at the Brazilian leg of Live Earth in Rio de Janeiro, making him one of three major international rock stars to perform two huge free concerts at the world-famous Copacabana Beach along with Macy Gray and the Rolling Stones. Kravitz had already played there on March 21, 2005, drawing 300,000 people on a concert of his own. The Live Earth concert, with eight other acts on the bill, including Pharrell and Macy Gray had an audience of 400,000 on the beach. Also in 2007, Kravitz released a version of "Cold Turkey" by John Lennon on the charity CD Instant Karma: The Amnesty International Campaign to Save Darfur. Kravitz also spent time recording his latest album, It Is Time for a Love Revolution, released February 5, 2008. On September 25, 2007, the Fats Domino tribute album Goin' Home; A Tribute To Fats Domino was released. Kravitz was on the song "Whole Lotta Lovin'" along with Rebirth Brass Band, Troy "Trombone Shorty" Andrews, Fred Wesley, Pee Wee Ellis, and Maceo Parker.

Kravitz performed at the Grey Cup halftime show in Toronto at the Rogers Centre on November 25, 2007, where the Saskatchewan Roughriders beat the Winnipeg Blue Bombers 23–19. The original video for "I'll Be Waiting" was shot in Central Park in New York City with Marc Webb directing but that video was later shelved and a new version, which Kravitz co-directed with Philip Andelman, was filmed in Kravitz's New York City recording studio. The video premiered on VH1's Top 20 Countdown at number 3. On January 17, 2008, Kravitz embarked on a nine-city mini-tour to promote his new album It Is Time for a Love Revolution. The tour started in Santa Monica, California and ended in New York City on February 1.

On February 11, 2008, Kravitz was admitted to Miami Hospital suffering from severe bronchitis. He had been suffering from a series of severe respiratory tract infections since mid-January, and the illness developed into bronchitis. Kravitz's illness had forced him to postpone Canadian dates and his trip to Europe to promote his album It Is Time for a Love Revolution. On March 19, 2008 he canceled the South American part of his tour due to the same illness. The decision affected planned concerts in Colombia, Mexico, Brazil, and Argentina. In Argentina Kravitz had a performance in the biggest rock festival there, Quilmes Rock Fest. On July 15, 2008, Kravitz was honored in Milan, Italy with the key to the city in a special toast ceremony for his work with the United Nations Millennium Campaign to end world poverty.

Kravitz made his feature film acting debut in Precious which premiered at the Sundance Film Festival in January 2009. During the Italian leg of his 53 date Let Love Rule 2009 European tour, Kravitz was instructed to cancel some shows due to another bad bout of bronchitis. Under strict orders from his doctor, the singer was told to rest so that he could make a quick recovery and return to the stage for the rest of his tour. Shows scheduled for Rome on June 5 and Brescia on June 17 were postponed to late July.

2009–2011: U2 tour and Black and White America

Kravitz's next album, tentatively titled Funk, was tentatively re-titled Negrophilia and was due out sometime in 2010. This is believed to be a project that Kravitz has been working on since 1997. Some of the original tracks for Funk were recorded while he was in New Orleans at Allen Toussaint's studio while taking a break for several months from recording in New York City. A video on Kravitz's Twitter page shows him working on one of the songs for the album, called "Super Love", in his GTS studios in the Bahamas. Another video shows him working on another track titled "Life Ain't Never Been Better Than It Is Now" in his GTS Studios. On his Twitter page, Kravitz said that the album title was Negrophilia but then "felt like something else". Eventually, the album was later named Black and White America. The album was released on August 22, 2011 in Europe and August 30, 2011 in the US.

On February 20, 2011, the first single "Come on Get It" was released. On June 6, 2011, the second single "Stand" was released. It was announced that Kravitz would be supporting U2 on their 360 Tour on the second North American leg in 2010. Kravitz agreed to support them for four shows. Though the shows were postponed until 2011, Kravitz remained committed for four of the shows.

In June 2010 it was announced that Kravitz would guest star on an episode of the upcoming season of Entourage.

In 2011 Kravitz was honored with one of the highest cultural awards in France when he was made an Officer of the Ordre des Arts et des Lettres by French cultural minister Frederic Mitterrand in Paris. Kravitz stated he was "particularly touched" to receive the award in France as his success in the country pre-dated his success in the United States and still enjoys great record sales in the country today. Kravitz joined other American recipients such as Martin Scorsese, George Clooney, and Bob Dylan. On February 26, 2012, he performed at the Daytona International Speedway for the Daytona 500, the opening race of the 2012 NASCAR Sprint Cup season. A sample of "Are You Gonna Go My Way" was used in American singer Chris Willis's single "Too Much In Love", released on August 16, 2011.

2012–present: The Hunger Games films, Super Bowl performance, and further albums 

Lenny Kravitz played the part of Katniss' creative stylist, Cinna, in the first two Hunger Games films, The Hunger Games released on March 23, 2012 and The Hunger Games: Catching Fire released on November 22, 2013.

In 2014 Lenny Kravitz released his tenth studio album Strut on his own Roxie Records via Kobalt Label Services. In 2015, Kravitz performed alongside Katy Perry at the Super Bowl XLIX halftime show.

In 2015, during a guitar solo at a concert in Stockholm, Kravitz squatted down, causing his leather pants to rip. Because Kravitz was not wearing underpants, his genitals were briefly exposed to the audience. He did not face any legal repercussions from the incident.

As a designer, Kravitz launched a furniture collection in partnership with CB2 in 2015.

In 2015 he became a furniture designer for the first time ever launching a collection of furniture products marketed under the label CB2 x Kravitz design through retailer CB2. The collection was apparently inspired by the 70s and by the work of Italian designer Gabriella Crespi.

In 2016 he guest starred on the FX Television show Better Things playing the part of Mel Trueblood. In 2017 he earned a spot on the Fox Television series Star playing the part of Roland Crane in his first recurring television role.

The Raise Vibration world tour, (2018) coincided with the release of his 11th studio album.

In April 2018, Kravitz signed with BMG Rights Management for a new worldwide publishing music deal to go with his new album Raise Vibration, released in September 2018. BMG had acquired Kravitz's music publishing rights in 2013, as part of Virgin Music Publishing.

In the same Rolling Stone interview it was confirmed that Kravitz had already begun work on a follow-up to Raise Vibration, as well as a possible soundtrack to a future film project.

In July 2022, Kravitz was named one of 2022's Most Beautiful Vegan Celebrities by PETA.

Other work

Photography and collaboration with Leica
Kravitz has partnered with Leica on two occasions.  In 2015 a Leica M-P edition titled "The Correspondent", and again in 2019 with a Monochrom edition titled "Drifter."  The 2019 collaboration also included a gallery of his own work, which was unveiled on May 24, 2019 and was on display until August 25 of 2019 in the Leica Gallery in Wetzlar Germany.

Kravitz Design
Kravitz Design Inc. is a New York City-based company founded by Kravitz in 2003. Kravitz Design focuses on commercial, residential and product creative direction and design. Among its clients are the Morgans Hotel Group, Swarovski Crystal, and The Setai Group. In 2010, Kravitz Design Inc. collaborated with Flavor Paper wallpaper on the Tropicalismo Collection, a line inspired by Brazil's Tropicalia art movement of the late 1960s.

Swarovski selected Kravitz Design Inc. in 2005 and 2006 to participate in their Crystal Palace Collection. Kravitz Design Inc. has also envisioned a luxury recording studio for The Setai Resort and Residences in Miami Beach, New York, Paris, and New Orleans.

Personal life

In 1985, Kravitz met Cosby Show actress Lisa Bonet backstage at a New Edition concert in California. They were close friends for two years before beginning a relationship. In 1987 Kravitz moved back to New York City, where The Cosby Show was produced to move in with Bonet. They eloped to be married in a Las Vegas ceremony on November 16, 1987, her 20th birthday. Kravitz, still known as Romeo Blue at the time, suddenly found himself in the headlines of tabloids. He and Bonet had a daughter, Zoë Isabella Kravitz, on December 1, 1988, who became an actress, singer and model. Kravitz and Bonet separated in 1991. They divorced amicably in 1993.

Kravitz dated French singer and model Vanessa Paradis from 1991 to 1996. He began dating Brazilian model Adriana Lima in 2001, and they lived together before becoming engaged in 2002. The engagement was called off in April 2003. Lima was featured in the music video for Kravitz's 2002 single "Yesterday Is Gone (My Dear Kay)". He then briefly dated and was engaged to Australian actress Nicole Kidman from 2003 to 2004.

Kravitz identifies himself as a Christian in a religious sense "through choice" but states, "I'm also a Jew. It's all the same to me." During another interview, he stated, "I'm half Jewish, I'm half black, I look in-between." He also notes that spirituality "has been an important issue in [his] growth", citing his upbringing by parents of different faiths. Such spirituality is prominently featured in many of his songs, such as the lyrics on his album Baptism, and a tattoo on his back which is inscribed with "My Heart Belongs to Jesus Christ". In 2011, he stated that his 2005 religious commitment to remain celibate until remarriage was unchanged. In a 2014 interview with Men's Health, however, he reconsidered his previous stance.

In 2017, Kravitz sold his Miami Beach home for $16.5 million. He currently owns a house in Paris, a farm compound in Brazil, and a trailer with the surrounding land in the Bahamas.

He follows veganism with a primarily raw vegan diet, and uses his land in Brazil and the Bahamas to grow his own food. PETA named Kravitz one of the Most Beautiful Vegan Celebrities of 2022, along with singer/songwriter Anitta.

He is a member of the Canadian charity Artists Against Racism, with whom he worked on a radio PSA.

Discography

Studio albums
 Let Love Rule (1989)
 Mama Said (1991)
 Are You Gonna Go My Way (1993)
 Circus (1995)
 5 (1998)
 Lenny (2001)
 Baptism (2004)
 It Is Time for a Love Revolution (2008)
 Black and White America (2011)
 Strut (2014)
 Raise Vibration  (2018)

Filmography

Film

Television

Tours

 Let Love Rule Tour (1990)
 There Is Only One Truth Tour (1991)
 Universal Love Tour (1993)
 Circus Tour (1995–96)
 The Freedom Tour (1998–99)
 Lenny Tour (2002)
 The Baptism Tour (2004)
 Celebration Tour (2005)
 Electric Church Tour: One Night Only (2005)
 Get on the Bus Mini-Tour (2008)
 Love Revolution Tour (2008)
 LLR 20(09) Tour (2009)
 Black and White Tour (2011)
 Strut Tour (2014–15)
 Raise Vibration Tour (2018–19)
 Here To Love Tour (2020)

Awards and nominations

Grammy awards and nominations

Billboard Music Awards

|-
| rowspan=3|1993
|  "Are You Gonna Go My Way"
| Top Album Rock Track
| 
|-
| rowspan=4|Himself
| Top Album Rock Tracks Artist
| 
|-
| rowspan=2|Top Modern Rock Tracks Artist
| 
|-
| rowspan=3|1999
| 
|-
| Top Hot 100 Artist - Male
| 
|-
| "Fly Away"
| Top Mainstream Rock Track
| 
|-
| rowspan=2|2001
| rowspan=2|Himself
| Top Male Artist
| 
|-
| Top Billboard 200 Artist - Male
|

Žebřík Music Awards

!Ref.
|-
| rowspan=5|1998
| rowspan=3|Himself
| Best International Male
| 
| rowspan=15|
|-
| Best International Instrumentalist
| 
|-
| Best International Personality
| 
|-
| 5
| Best International Album
| 
|-
| "I Belong to You"
| Best International Song
| 
|-
| rowspan=2|1999
| rowspan=4|Himself
| Best International Male
| 
|-
| rowspan=2|Best International Instrumentalist
| 
|-
| rowspan=4|2000
| 
|-
| Best International Male
| 
|-
| rowspan=2|"Again"
| Best International Song
| 
|-
| Best International Video
| 
|-
| rowspan=3|2001
| Lenny
| Best International Album
| 
|-
| rowspan=6|Himself
| Best International Personality 
| 
|-
| rowspan=5|Best International Male
| 
|-
| 2002
| 
|-
| 2004
| 
| rowspan=5|
|-
| 2007
| 
|-
| rowspan=2|2008
| 
|-
| "I'll Be Waiting"
| Best International Song
| 
|-
| 2009
| rowspan=2|Himself
| rowspan=2|Best International Male
| 
|-
| 2011
| 
|

Other awards and nominations

See also

List of artists who reached number one on the U.S. Mainstream Rock chart
List of artists who reached number one on the U.S. Modern Rock chart
List of artists who reached number one on the UK Singles Chart
List of artists who reached number one on the Australian singles chart
List of blues musicians
List of Gibson players
List of Number 1 albums from the 1990s (UK)
List of Number 1 singles from the 1990s (UK)
List of performers on Top of the Pops
List of Saturday Night Live hosts and musical guests

Notes

Citations

General sources 
 di Martino, Dave. Singer-songwriters: Pop music's performer-composers, from A to Zevon, Billboard Books, 1994.
 Gregory, Hugh. 1000 Great Guitarists: Rock, Jazz, Country, Funk ..., Balafon Books, 1994.
 la Blanc, Michael (ed.). Contemporary musicians, Vol. 5, Gale Research, 1991.
 Larkin, Colin. The Guinness Encyclopedia of Popular Music, Guinness Publishing, 1992.
 Whitburn, Joel. The Billboard Book of Top 40 Hits, 5th edition, Watson-Guptill Publications, 1992.

Further reading
 Anderson, Ashely (November 9, 2000). "Brown eyes blue". The Silhouette. Volume 71, Number 12. Retrieved on March 11, 2007.
 Cooper, Carol (1990). "Let love rule – Lisa Bonet and husband Lenny Kravitz". Essence. Retrieved on March 11, 2007.
 Halbersberg, Elianne (November 1, 2004). "Flying (Almost) Solo". Mix. Retrieved on March 13, 2007.
 "Behind the Music: Lenny Kravitz". Harper, William & Williams, Paulina (Directors). Behind the Music. VH1. June 27, 1999. Season 2, no. 35.
 Henderson, Ashyia N. (2002). Contemporary Black Biography: Profiles from the International Black Community. Gale Group. .
 Pepper, Tracey (July 1998). "Deep joy – musical artist Lenny Kravitz – Interview". Retrieved on March 12, 2007.
 "Artist Profile – Lenny Kravitz". EMI Music Publishing. Retrieved on March 11, 2007.
 "HELLO! Profiles – Lenny Kravitz". Hello!. Retrieved on March 11, 2007.
 
 "Romeo Blue Discography, Biography and Links". Mr. Bill's I.R.S. Records Corner. Retrieved on March 11, 2007.
 Scarlett MacDougal's book series "Have a Nice Life", refers to the main girl's "intergalactic angel/fairy godmother" as a Lenny Kravitz lookalike, though his actual name is Clarence Terence.

External links

 Lenny Kravitz official site
 Lenny Kravitz – The Artists Organization – Management
 
 
 
 "Lenny Kravitz: Ice Ice Lenny"—interview by Pete Lewis, Blues & Soul no. 1096, July 2009

|-
! colspan="3" style="background: #DAA520;"|Grammy Award
|-

|-
! colspan="3" style="background: #DAA520;"|MTV Video Music Awards
|-

 
1964 births
20th-century American guitarists
20th-century American male actors
21st-century American male actors
African-American Christians
African-American guitarists
African-American Jews
African-American male actors
20th-century African-American male singers
African-American record producers
African-American rock musicians
African-American rock singers
African-American male singer-songwriters
American expatriates in France
American expatriates in the Bahamas
American furniture designers
American interior designers
American male child actors
American male drummers
American male film actors
American male guitarists
American male voice actors
American multi-instrumentalists
American music video directors
American rock guitarists
American rock singers
American rock songwriters
American tenors
Atlantic Records artists
Beverly Hills High School alumni
Brit Award winners
Converts to Christianity
Grammy Award winners
Guitarists from New York City
Jewish American musicians
Jewish rock musicians
Lead guitarists
Living people
Male actors from New York City
Musicians from Brooklyn
Officiers of the Ordre des Arts et des Lettres
Record producers from California
Record producers from New York (state)
Rhythm guitarists
Roadrunner Records artists
Singers from New York City
Virgin Records artists
Singer-songwriters from New York (state)
21st-century African-American male singers